Motički Gaj is a village in the municipality of Žabljak, Montenegro.

Demographics
According to the 2011 census, its population was 156.

References

Populated places in Žabljak Municipality